Tractable may refer to:

 Operation Tractable, a military operation in Normandy 1944
 Tractable problem, in computational complexity theory, a problem that can be solved in polynomial time
 Tractable, ease of obtaining a mathematical solution such as a closed-form expression 
 Tractable (company), an artificial intelligence company from the United Kingdom